Confederation Cup may refer to various sports competitions. It most commonly refers to:

the FIFA Confederations Cup, for International football
the CAF Confederation Cup, for African club football
the Confederation Cup Pace, Canadian harness race